Trap (1966) is the first novel by Australian author Peter Mathers. It won the Miles Franklin Award for 1966.

Story outline

The novel follows the life of Jack Trap, a man living on the outskirts of Melbourne in the 1960s.  Trap is of mixed Irish, English and Aboriginal background, in his forties and fat.  He joins with a small group of outsiders and travels to a mining lease on Cape York to form a co-operative community.

Critical reception

In The Canberra Times Maurice Dunlevy found that the attempted satire fell well short of its target: "Trap is a first novel and reads like one. It attempts to be satirical, shocking and avant garde — succeeds only in being naive...His irony is too heavy, his targets are too obvious and he never cuts deeper than satirical revue."

References

1966 Australian novels
Miles Franklin Award-winning works
Cassell (publisher) books
1966 debut novels